The Society for Early Historic Archaeology was an organization based at Brigham Young University (BYU) in Provo, Utah which sought to disseminate information related to Hebrew-Christian and Latter-day Saint scriptures and archaeology throughout the world of the earliest historical time period.

History

The society was organized in BYU's Department of Archaeology as the University Archaeological Society in 1949.  It published a newsletter and held annual symposiums.  In 1967 its name was changed to the Society for Early Historic Archaeology.  It split off from BYU in 1979 and afterward began a slow decline until ceasing in 1990.

Notes

Sources
header of society newsletter copy at SHIELDS website
Society's constitution

Brigham Young University
Organizations established in 1949
Organizations disestablished in 1990
1949 establishments in Utah
1990 disestablishments in Utah